Gouranga Biswas (born 17 December 1987 in Kolkata) is an Indian footballer who is currently playing for Eagles F.C. on loan from IMG RELIANCE as a midfielder.

External links
 Profile  at Goal.com
 
 

Indian footballers
1987 births
Living people
Footballers from Kolkata
I-League players
East Bengal Club players
Air India FC players
United SC players
Association football midfielders